Jörg Neun (born 7 May 1966 in Ortenberg, Hesse) is a German former professional footballer who played as a midfielder or defender.

Honours
Borussia Mönchengladbach
 DFB-Pokal: 1994–95; runners-up 1991–92, 1997–98

References

1966 births
Living people
Association football midfielders
German footballers
Germany under-21 international footballers
Bundesliga players
2. Bundesliga players
Kickers Offenbach players
1. FC Nürnberg players
SC Fortuna Köln players
SV Waldhof Mannheim players
Borussia Mönchengladbach players
MSV Duisburg players
People from Wetteraukreis
Sportspeople from Darmstadt (region)
Footballers from Hesse
West German footballers